Vance is an unincorporated community in Morrill County, Nebraska, United States.

History
Vance was located on the Chicago, Burlington and Quincy Railroad.

References

Unincorporated communities in Morrill County, Nebraska
Unincorporated communities in Nebraska